WRCO-FM (100.9 MHz, "Country & Community") is a radio station broadcasting a country music format. Licensed to Richland Center, Wisconsin, United States, the station is currently owned by Civic Media and features programming from The Associated Press and Packers Radio Network.

References

External links

Country radio stations in the United States
RCO-FM
Richland County, Wisconsin
Radio stations established in 1965
1965 establishments in Wisconsin